Brnjavac is a village in central Croatia, in the municipality of Gvozd, Sisak-Moslavina County. It is connected by the D6 highway.

Demographics
According to the 2011 census, the village of Brnjavac has 161 inhabitants. This represents 43.06% of its pre-war population according to the 1991 census.

References

Populated places in Sisak-Moslavina County
Serb communities in Croatia